Rima Zahia is a sinuous rille on the Moon at , in Mare Imbrium.  It is approximately 15 km in length.

The name was adopted by the IAU in 1976.  Zahia is an Arabic female name, and the rille is not named after a particular person.

Rima Zahia lies to the north of Catena Yuri and east of Courtney crater.

References

Mare Imbrium